Bass Hill was an electoral district of the Legislative Assembly in the Australian State of New South Wales from 1962 to 1991, including the Sydney suburb of  Bass Hill.

Members for Bass Hill

Election results

References

Bass Hill
1962 establishments in Australia
Constituencies established in 1962
1991 disestablishments in Australia
Constituencies disestablished in 1991